The Lekki–Epe Expressway is a  expressway connecting the Lekki and Epe districts in Lagos State.
The Lekki-Epe expressway was first built in the 1980s. It was built during the Lateef Jakande's administration. It is the second private toll project in Africa. The road construction project was financed by the African Development Bank. The bank provided a loan of up to US$85 million to help fund the upgrade and rehabilitation of the Lekki to Epe expressway in 2008, and it was based on Public-Private Partnership (PPP) under the Design, Build, Operate (DBOT), and Transfer and Rehabilitate, Operate (ROT) framework/business model.

The Lekki Concession Company manages the toll road.

2020 Massacre 

On the night of 20 October 2020, at about 6:50 p.m., members of the Nigerian Army opened fire on unarmed End SARS protesters at the Lekki toll gate. Amnesty International stated that at least 12 protesters were killed during the shooting. A day after the incident, on 21 October, the governor of Lagos State, Babajide Sanwo-Olu, after initially denying reports of any loss of lives, admitted in an interview with a CNN journalist that "only two persons were killed".
The Nigerian Army initially denied involvement in the shooting. Still, it later stated that it had deployed soldiers to the toll gate on the orders of the governor of Lagos State. 
A month after the shooting, following a CNN documentary, the Nigerian Army admitted to the Lagos Judiciary panel of inquiry into the shooting that it had deployed its personnel to the toll gate with live and blank bullets.

References 

Roads in Lagos
Highways in Nigeria